Kozakura may refer to:

 (born 1971), Japanese voice actress
Kozakura-ikka, yakuza group
Kozakura class traffic boat, motor gunboat of the Imperial Japanese Navy

Japanese-language surnames